Qassem Lajami (born 24 April 1996) is a professional football player who plays as a defender for Saudi Professional League side Al-Fateh.

Career statistics

Club

References

External links 
 

1996 births
Living people
Al-Muheet SC players
Khaleej FC players
Al-Fateh SC players
Saudi Arabian footballers
Saudi Arabia youth international footballers
Saudi Arabia international footballers
Saudi First Division League players
Saudi Professional League players
Association football defenders
Saudi Arabian Shia Muslims